Yerradoddipalli is a small village in Annamayya district of Andhra Pradesh state in India.

Villages in Annamayya district